William Stapleton (ca. 1495 – 1544), of Wighill, Yorkshire and London, was an English politician.

He was a Member (MP) of the Parliament of England for Carlisle in 1542.

References

1490s births
1544 deaths
People from the Borough of Harrogate
English MPs 1542–1544